Ndani TV is a web-based channel owned by GTBank.

History 

Ndani TV was established in 2012 by GTBank to offer both entertainment and informative content in order to attract a youthful customer base. It was the first online video content vehicle launched by a Nigerian bank and has grown into a media company. Since its launch, Ndani TV  gained traction with productions such as Frank Donga’s The Interview, Skinny Girl in Transit and the Ndani TGIF show.

It has over 107 million YouTube views and over 519,000 subscribers at January 2023.

Ndani TV offers its audience an insider's look at the African continent, Hence the name ‘Ndani’ which is a Swahili word for ‘Inside’.

Productions

TV Shows 
37 Questions 
Afrocity 
Fashion Insider  
Game On 
 Gidi Up 
Lagos Big Boy 
Ndani Real Talk 
 Ndani Sessions 
 Ndani TGIF Show 
Phases 
 Ratings 
Rumor Has It 
 Skinny Girl in Transit 
 The Interview
 The Juice 
The Mix

Ndani Shorts 

 Frost Bite 
 FRACTURED 
 The Housewife

Oga Pastor Controversy 
After 3 episodes aired, it was noted that NdaniTV took down Oga Pastor, a series about the life of a pastor balancing personal issues, scandals and church responsibilities. This occurred in the midst of sexual assault allegations against Pastor Biodun Fatoyinbo and led to speculation of the take down being related to the situation. Ndani TV did not issue an official statement.

Recognition 
YouTube Creator Award for Entertainment in 2016.

Gallery

See also 

 Skinny Girl in Transit
 Gidi Up
 Jadesola Osiberu

References 

YouTube channels
Mass media in Nigeria
Nigerian YouTubers
Companies based in Lagos